Hesperilla picta, also known as the painted sedge-skipper or painted skipper, is a species of butterfly in the family Hesperiidae. It is found in the Australian states of New South Wales, Queensland and Victoria.

The wingspan is about 30 mm.

The larvae feed on Gahnia clarkei.

External links
Australian Insects
Australian Faunal Directory

Trapezitinae
Butterflies described in 1814
Butterflies of Australia
Taxa named by William Elford Leach